The Miles Canyon Basalts represent a package of rocks that include various exposures of basaltic lava flows and cones that erupted and flowed across an ancient pre-glacial landscape in south-central Yukon.

The volcanic rocks are best exposed and most easily accessible at the Miles Canyon location where the Yukon River cuts through a succession of flows south of Whitehorse. In the spring, good exposures can also be seen immediately downstream from the Yukon River hydro dam in Whitehorse which was built to extract energy from the cataracts that were the White Horse Rapids. These rapids and the Miles Canyon provided a significant challenge to gold-seekers heading to the Klondike Gold Rush, and also established the upstream terminus for paddle-wheel river boats. Thus, the Miles Canyon Basalts are the reason for the establishment of the townsite of Closeleigh, eventually the City of Whitehorse.

The lava flows and cinder cones in the Alligator Lake volcanic complex southwest of Whitehorse are the greatest accumulation of these rocks.

The Miles Canyon Basalts were thought to be Pleistocene age. However, geological investigations supported by geochronological analyses indicate that these rocks are much older.  The 'type' Miles Canyon flows along the Yukon River are ~8.4 million years old (Miocene) and the Alligator Lake flows are ~3.2 million years old (Pliocene).  The Alligator Lake cones may be younger but have been affected by glaciation so are not entirely post-glacial in age.

See also
Volcanism in Canada
List of volcanoes in Canada

References

Pearson, F.K., Hart, C.J.R., Powers, M., Distribution of Miles Canyon basalt in the Whitehorse area and implications for groundwater resources.  In: Yukon Exploration and Geology 2000, D.S. Emond and L.H. Weston (eds.), Exploration and Geological Services Division, Yukon, Indian and Northern Affairs Canada, p. 235-245.  http://emrlibrary.gov.yk.ca/ygs/yeg/2000/2000_p235-246.pdf
Hart, C.J.R., and Villeneuve, M. 1999.  Geochronology of Neogene alkaline volcanic rocks (Miles Canyon basalt), southern Yukon Territory, Canada: the relative effectiveness of laser 40Ar/39Ar and K-Ar geochronology. Canadian Journal of Earth Sciences, v. 36, p. 1495-1507, 10.1139/e99-049  http://www.nrcresearchpress.com/doi/abs/10.1139/e99-049#.VASMHkDCdYA

Volcanoes of Yukon
Northern Cordilleran Volcanic Province
Pliocene volcanism
Miocene volcanism
Neogene Yukon
Lava flows